Statistics of Latvian Higher League in the 1989 season.

Overview
It was contested by 17 teams, and RAF won the championship.

League standings

References
 RSSSF

Latvian SSR Higher League
Football 
Latvia